Sphecodes albilabris is a solitary parasitic bee that is endemic to Central and Western Europe. It also occurs in North Africa and is thought to have been introduced to the United States and Australia by accident.

Description
The length of the bee is 11–14 mm.

Range
This species shows a transpalaearctic distribution. It occurs in North Africa from Morocco to Egypt. In Eurasia it occurs from Portugal via Europe, Asia Minor, Levant, Caucasus, Central Asia and Siberia to the Pacific coast of the Far East, reaches the oriental fauna region in northwest India (Uttar Pradesh); north to 60 ° N in Norway (Hønefoss), 62.5 ° N in Sweden (Västernorrland), 63.5 ° N in Finland (North Karelia), in Russia to Karelia and Kirov; south to Sicily, Crete, Cyprus and Israel. The ssp. rubripes SPINOLA, 1838 occurs in North Africa, Levante, Iberia including the Balearic Islands, Sardinia and Cyprus.

Habitat
Inland dunes, drifting sand fields, sand pits, grasslands, flood dams, mainly in sand but also loess areas. From the lowlands to the montane elevation.

Ecology
It flies from March to October. Females are flying from March to August, males from July to October.

The larvae of this species are parasites of Colletes cunicularius. The species was also observed in the nests of Halictus sexcinctus, Halictus quadricinctus and Melitturga clavicornis.

Etymology
From Latin "albus" = "white" and "labrum" = "lip"; because of the snow-white hairy lower half of the face of the male.

Taxonomy
Synonyms: Sphecodes fuscipennis (GERMAR, 1819)

References

External links
 Wildebijen.nl 
 Sphecodes albilabris at Fauna Europaea

Halictidae
Hymenoptera of Europe
Insects described in 1793